Maugersbury is a village and civil parish in Gloucestershire, England. At the 2001 United Kingdom census, the parish had a population of 149.

History
The town is said to have originated as an Iron Age fort on its defensive hill top position. Indeed, there are many similar forts in the area, and Stone Age and Bronze Age burial mounds are also common.

Maugersbury is located less than a mile from Stow-on-the-Wold, which was originally called Edwardstow after the town's patron saint Edward (possibly Edward the Martyr). During Saxon times it is likely that Maugersbury was the primary settlement of the parish, before Stow was built as a marketplace by the Normans in 1107 AD, to be nearer the cross roads. Maugersbury was listed as MalgeresberiAe in the Domesday Book of 1086.

The Maugersbury Enclosure Bill was passed in 1766, and later the village was the location of the Stow on the Wold Union Workhouse.

Governance
Maugersbury is in the Stow ward of the Cotswold District Council, represented by Liberal Democrat Councillor Dilys Neill. Maugersbury is part of the constituency of The Cotswolds, represented at parliament by Conservative MP Geoffrey Clifton-Brown. It was part of the South West England constituency of the European Parliament prior to Britain leaving the European Union in January 2020.

Footnotes

Sources

Villages in Gloucestershire
Cotswold District
Civil parishes in Gloucestershire